Speocera taprobanica is a species of spider of the family Ochyroceratidae. It is endemic to Sri Lanka.

See also
 List of Ochyroceratidae species

References

Ochyroceratidae
Spiders of Asia
Arthropods of Sri Lanka
Endemic fauna of Sri Lanka
Spiders described in 1981